Barbarian 2 may refer to:

Barbarian II: The Dungeon of Drax, a 1988 Palace Software video game
Barbarian II, a 1991 Psygnosis video game